Gilbert "Magu" Luján (October 16, 1940 – July 24, 2011) was a well known and influential Chicano sculptor, muralist and painter. He founded the famous Chicano collective Los Four that consisted of artists Carlos Almaraz, Beto de la Rocha (Father of former Rage Against the Machine frontman Zack de la Rocha), Frank Romero and himself.  In 1974, Judithe Hernández became the "fifth" and only female member of Los Four.

Luján was born in French Camp, California, near Stockton, to parents of Mexican and indigenous ancestry from West Texas. Six months later, his family relocated to East Los Angeles, California, where he spent his childhood and adolescence, except for some time in Guadalajara in 1944 or 1945. As a young teenager, Luján was heavily influenced by the Afro-American music scene in Los Angeles, for instance listening to Johnny Ace and Mary Wells. He went to El Monte High School, class of 1958.

Background
After serving in the Air Force, Luján returned home from three years in England in 1962 and began to attend college, first at East Los Angeles College, then to California State University, Long Beach, where he earned his B.A. in Ceramic Sculpture in 1969 and then to University of California, Irvine, where he earned an M.F.A. in Sculpture in 1973.  By this time East L.A. had become a hotbed of socio-political and cultural activity, as the Chicano Movement became a turbulent and exciting social force in the communities the U.S. Southwest. At this time, Luján began to organize art exhibits and artists' conferences to establish Chicano Art as a valid form of artistic expression. The first of these was held at Camp Hess Kramer, which was, according to Luján, "a Jewish camp that allowed Mexican-Americans to meet there to talk about educational disparities that we had in East L.A."  In 1969, Luján curated a Chicano art show at Cal State Long Beach, and during the show's run, met with various artists associated with East LA art journal Con Safos.  Luján was invited to become art director of Con Safos, and through this work, he met with three other like-minded Chicano artists and formed Los Four in the Fall of 1973 at the University of California, Irvine.  In 1973, Los Four had their premiere exhibition at UC Irvine.  In 1974, Los Four exhibited the Los Angeles County Museum of Art's first-ever Chicano Art show, appropriately called "Los Four." This was quickly followed by several other exhibitions on the west coast. Los Four did for Chicano visual art what ASCO had done for Chicano performance art; that is, it helped establish the themes, esthetic and vocabulary of the nascent movement. "Magu," the name by which Luján is most known, says of that time:
The significance of Los Four mirrored the socio-political introspection and concerns of Raza at that time besides providing some iconographic vocabulary to initiate definitions of our ethno-art forms. Our Los Four Xicano contingency ran against some Euro-aesthetic standards of the period. We, as pictorial artists, gave a visual voice to those interests of parity for our young artist constituency-culture. It was a form of cooperation binding us by our sociological circumstance, indigenous paradigms and our adopted response to unify ourselves along political cultural oriented purposes, in lieu of solely aesthetical ones.

From 1976-1980, Luján taught at the La Raza Studies Department at Fresno City College becoming department chair 1980. Since then, Luján has worked full-time on his artwork, devoted to developing his aesthetic. During the years of 1999-2007, Magu held his art studio operations at the Pomona Art Colony in downtown Pomona, CA, helping to garner appreciation and support of the arts in the city and surrounding communities. During 2005, he took on a position as art professor at Pomona College, one of the seven prestigious Claremont Colleges.

In 1990 Magu was commissioned as a design principal for the Hollywood & Vine station on the Metro Rail Red Line (Hollywood/Vine (LACMTA station)) in Los Angeles, California. By 1999 Magu completed a series of wall tiles and platform sculptural benches in the form of lowrider automobiles. He chose the theme song, "Hooray for Hollywood," as the signature tune for the Hollywood & Vine Metro station. A design rudder established was "light," which Luján considered another central motif in Hollywood, from the light that passed through film projectors to the sunny streets of Southern California to the creation of celebrity "Stars." The Yellow Brick Road, which was built to run from the plaza (which is currently being demolished to build a high-rise with chain restaurants and businesses) to the train platform, is a prominent motif taken from the 1939 classic movieThe Wizard of Oz, a movie which was an inspiration to Luján's work.

Magu's artwork became famous in its own right throughout the 1980s and 1990s as it used colorful imagery, anthropomorphic animals, depictions of outrageously proportioned lowriders, festooned with Indigenous/urban motifs juxtaposed, graffiti, Dia De Los Muertos installation altars and all sorts of borrowings from pop-culture. Magu states: 
"My art intentions, over the years, have been to use Mesoamerican heritage as well as implementing current popular Art and cultural folk sources as the content substance to make Chicanarte."

One of his sons is the accordionist Otoño Luján, who is a member of the band Conjunto Los Pochos.

Installations and exhibitions
 Hollywood/Vine (Los Angeles Metro station)
 Los Angeles County Museum of Art
 Corcoran Gallery of Art
 University of California, Irvine
 Brooklyn Museum
 Museum of Fine Arts, Houston
 Guadalupe Center for the Arts
 Centro de la Raza, Balboa Park, San Diego, CA
 "Inaugural Museum Show" at the El Paso Art Museum, El Paso, Texas
 "Le Demon des Anges", a European Art Tour, with 16 Chicano Artists in Nante & Leon, France; Barcelona, Spain; and in Sweden
 "Caliente y Picante" an HBO Art Special
 The Cheech Marin Center for Chicano Art, Culture & Industry

References

External links

 Images of Luján's work on Hollywood & Vine metro station:

1940 births
2011 deaths
Sculptors from California
California State University, Long Beach alumni
American artists of Mexican descent
American muralists
Deaths from prostate cancer
People from French Camp, California
Military personnel from California
Art in Greater Los Angeles
Fresno City College faculty
Pomona College faculty
Hispanic and Latino American artists